Lefter Koka (born 4 August 1964 in Durrës) is an Albanian politician who served as the Minister of Environment in the centre-left Coalition Government of Albania and was also a member of the Assembly of the Republic of Albania for the Socialist Party of Albania. Originally serving as a member for the Socialist Movement for Integration. Koka served as Mayor of Durrës from 2003 to 2007.

References

1964 births
Living people
Government ministers of Albania
Environment ministers of Albania
Mayors of Durrës
Members of the Parliament of Albania
People from Durrës
Socialist Movement for Integration politicians
21st-century Albanian politicians